Shock Treatment is an album by trumpeter Don Ellis recorded in 1968 and released on the Columbia label.

Reception

Rolling Stone writer John Grissim wrote on the album's release that "Shock Treatment isn't really. But it does offer ten tightly arranged compositions notable for brassy melodic lines superimposed on a rhythmically complex percussion base. The album's desirability as an addition to a record collection is largely dependent upon whether you have a taste for a big band sound".
The Allmusic site awarded the album 3 stars stating "Don Ellis was such a talented trumpeter, composer, and organizer that everything he recorded as a leader has at least some unusual moments worth exploring. His big bands were characterized by big brassy arrangements, odd meters that somehow always swung, lots of trumpet solos by Ellis, and an often visceral excitement. Although not equal to his best records such as Electric Bath, this late recording of Ellis' band is filled with all these traits, and thus exudes lots of excitement and electricity". The Penguin Guide to Jazz said "There are signs that Ellis was moving in a more commercial direction at this point, perhaps aware that jazz was still losing ground to pop and rock, though he must have known that as long as popular music was dance-driven it was unlikely that his work would have a major market presence".

Track listing 
All compositions by Don Ellis except as indicated
 "A New Kind of Country" (Hank Levy) - 4:10 
 "Night City" (Don Ellis, Kelly MacFadden) - 2:56 
 "Homecoming" - 3:02 
 "Mercy Maybe Mercy" (Levy) - 3:24 
 "Zim" (John Magruder) - 4:03 
 "Opus 5" (Howlett Smith) - 9:23 
 "Star Children" - 3:25 
 "Beat Me Daddy, Seven to the Bar" - 6:16 
 "Milo's Theme" - 4:28 
 "Seven Up" (Smith) - 4:03 
 "The Tihai" - 8:48 
 "Zim" [alternate take] (Magruder) - 4:04  Bonus track on CD reissue  
 "I Remember Clifford" (Benny Golson) - 5:29  Bonus track on CD reissue 
 "Rasty" - 2:52 Bonus track on CD reissue

Personnel 
Don Ellis - trumpet, arranger
Alan Weight, Ed Warren, Glenn Stuart, Bob Harmon - trumpet
Vince Diaz, Ron Myers, Dave Sanchez - trombone
Terry Woodson - bass trombone 
Ruben Leon, Joe Lopez, Joe Roccisano - alto saxophone, soprano saxophone, flute
Ira Shulman - tenor saxophone, flute, piccolo flute, clarinet 
Ron Starr - tenor saxophone, flute, clarinet
John Magruder - baritone saxophone, flute, clarinet, bass clarinet 
Mike Lang - piano, electric piano, clavinet 
Frank DeLaRosa, Dave Parlato - bass
Ray Neapolitan - bass, sitar 
Alan Estes - timbales, percussion
Steve Bohannon - drums
Carlos "Patato" Valdes, Chino Valdes - bongos, congas 
Mark Stevens, Ralph Humphrey - timbales, percussion, vibraphone

References 

Don Ellis albums
1968 albums
Albums produced by John Hammond (producer)
Columbia Records albums